The 2004 United States presidential election in Alabama took place on November 2, 2004. Voters chose nine representatives, or electors, to the Electoral College, who voted for president and vice president.

Alabama was won by incumbent President George W. Bush by a 25.62% margin of victory. Prior to the election, all 12 news organizations considered this was a state Bush would win, or otherwise a red state. On election day, it trended Republican sharply, by a swing margin of 10.74% from the 2000 election. Bush won with over 60% of the vote, a first since 1984, and carried most of the counties and congressional districts. Historically, Alabama is a very reliable Republican state that a Democratic presidential nominee has not won since 1976, when Southern governor of Georgia Jimmy Carter ran and swept the Deep South.

Primaries
2004 Alabama Democratic presidential primary

Campaign

Predictions

There were 12 news organizations who made state-by-state predictions of the election. Here are their last predictions before election day.

Polling

Bush won every single pre-election poll, and won each by a double-digit margin of victory. The final three polls averaged Bush leading 58% to 38%.

Fundraising
Bush raised $3,092,923. Kerry raised $514,589.

Advertising and visits
Neither campaign advertised or visited this state during the fall campaign.

Analysis 
Bush easily won every poll taken in the state prior to the election. Kerry won a small section of counties in the middle of the state, including winning Alabama's 7th congressional district. In 2000, the state voted for Bush 56%–41% by fifteen points; this year it voted for him by 25 points.

With the exception of Oklahoma in 2004, the state was also Bush's best performance in the South, with not even Texas, Bush's home state, voting as red as Alabama.

CNN exit polls showed that almost 70% of male voters voted for Bush. Also, 99% of registered Republicans (which made up 48% of the population) voted for Bush. Also, 43% of the state describe themselves as evangelical Christians, and 88% of them voted for Bush. 62% of the state approved of Bush, and 60% approved of the decision to go to war in Iraq. 82% of white men and 79% of white women voted for Bush. Finally, 70% of voters over the age of sixty voted for Bush. Alabama was racially divided: Alabama Whites voted 80%–19% for Bush while Blacks voted 91%-9% for Kerry.

, Bush is the last Republican to carry Jefferson (home of Birmingham, the state's largest city), and majority-black Marengo counties in a presidential election.

Results

By county

Counties that flipped from Democratic to Republican
Barbour (Largest city: Eufaula)
Choctaw (Largest city: Butler)
Colbert (Largest city: Muscle Shoals)
Conecuh (Largest city: Evergreen)
Jackson (Largest city: Scottsboro)
Lawrence (Largest city: Moulton)
Marengo (Largest city: Linden)

By congressional district
Bush won 6 of 7 congressional districts, including one held by a Democrat.

Electors 

Technically the voters of Alabama cast their ballots for electors: representatives to the Electoral College. Alabama is allocated 9 electors because it has 7 congressional districts and 2 senators. All candidates who appear on the ballot or qualify to receive write-in votes must submit a list of 9 electors, who pledge to vote for their candidate and his or her running mate. Whoever wins the majority of votes in the state is awarded all 9 electoral votes. Their chosen electors then vote for president and vice president. Although electors are pledged to their candidate and running mate, they are not obligated to vote for them. An elector who votes for someone other than his or her candidate is known as a faithless elector.

The electors of each state and the District of Columbia met on December 13, 2004, to cast their votes for president and vice president. The Electoral College itself never meets as one body. Instead the electors from each state and the District of Columbia met in their respective capitols.

The following were the members of the Electoral College from the state. All were pledged to and voted for George W. Bush and Dick Cheney.

 Beth Chapman
 Marty Connors
 Martha Hosey
 Will Sellers
 Mike Hubbard
 Floyd Lawson
 Elbert Peters
 Bettye Fine Collins
 Martha Stokes

See also
United States presidential elections in Alabama

References

Alabama
2004
2004 Alabama elections